The 1909 Ole Miss Rebels football team represented the University of Mississippi during the 1909 college football season. Under first year head coach Nathan Stauffer, the team posted a 4–3–2. In the 9 to 5 victory in the Egg Bowl, Earl Kinnebrew was called by the Jackson Clarion-Ledger "the particular star of his team."

Schedule

References

Ole Miss
Ole Miss Rebels football seasons
Ole Miss Rebels football